International British School of Bucharest (abbreviated IBSB; formerly Fundatia International British School of Bucharest) is a British school in Bucharest, Romania. The school was established in September 2000.

The school serves students 3–19 years old by providing a holistic British educational experience. It is accredited by Cambridge University as an international examination centre. Students from 30 different nationalities learn at this school. The school provides a co-educational environment for children with a curriculum based on the National Curriculum of England and Wales. The curriculum leads to Cambridge University IGCSE examinations in Year 11. The International A Level is taught in Year 12 and Year 13.

There are 28 examinable subjects available, and students are also entered for Cambridge Checkpoint exams. Romanian is taught as a language along with French, Spanish and German. The teaching body is a blend of British and local Romanian graduate teachers. IBSB has no more than 23 students in each year group. All junior classes have assistant teachers alongside a British professional.

The school is housed in purpose designed buildings close to the city center. The school can be accessed by bus or by the city metro. The secondary school contains a dedicated science laboratory and ICT suite. There is a substantial play area to the front of the school. The school provides a bus service, hot lunches and an extensive program of after school activities. There is also a program of Saturday morning revision classes for senior students on examination programs. The academic year is 180 days for students and the year always begins in September. School uniform is worn, as in England, and a school prefect system and student council are in operation. The school has an open admissions policy and children are placed according to their ages and abilities. The school also offers volunteering for students in Year 12 and Year 13 as part of the CAS program. The school runs between 08.30 and 16.00, Monday to Thursday, and 8.30 – 15.00 on Friday. The students have a great time with their peers and teachers, it is a friendly place were students learn and make new friends.

External links
 International British School of Bucharest website

Educational institutions established in 2000
International schools in Bucharest
High schools in Bucharest
2000 establishments in Romania